= Volunteer Fire Assistance =

Volunteer Fire Assistance is a State & Private Forestry program under which the Forest Service provides financial and technical assistance to states for grants and agreements with volunteer fire departments that protect communities of fewer than 10,000 people.
